Agathophora is a genus of flowering plants belonging to the family Amaranthaceae.

Its native range is Northern Africa to Arabian Peninsula.

Species:

Agathophora alopecuroides

References

Amaranthaceae
Amaranthaceae genera